Inskeep is a surname. Notable people with the surname include:

Gary Inskeep (born 1947), Canadian football player
John Inskeep (1757–1834), American politician
Steve Inskeep (born 1968), American journalist